Barryville is an unincorporated community in Macon County, in the U.S. state of Missouri.

History
Barryville had its start as a post office to the surrounding area. A post office called Barryville was established in 1872, and remained in operation until 1899.

References

Unincorporated communities in Macon County, Missouri
Unincorporated communities in Missouri